Cookies 'n Cream is a collaborative studio album by American rappers Blanco and Yukmouth, released July 10, 2012 on Guerrilla/Smoke-a-Lot Records.

Track listing

References

External links 
 Smokelotrecords.com Official Label Website

2012 albums
Yukmouth albums